Hell's Kitchen Albania (also known as Kuzhina e Djallit) was an Albanian cooking reality competition television series based on the British series of the same name. It premiered on Top Channel on 19 October 2018 and ended after three seasons on January 2, 2021. The show was hosted by Albanian chef Renato Mekolli.

Format
The Albanian format reflects the American version. Two teams of aspiring chefs, equally divided between men and women, challenge tests with cooking and table service at the restaurant Hell's Kitchen Albania, supervised and judged by chef Renato Mekolli. A key feature of the program is the psychological pressure to which chef Renato submits competitors; in fact, he does not hesitate to turn to them using particularly offensive insults and epithets, to criticize or scold them, get them to work more efficiently, or even to drive them out of the kitchen.

Each season opens with competitors, always divided between men and women, presenting to a dish to chef Renato, in an attempt to showcase their talents. Starting next episode, the first part of each episode consists of a challenge between the two teams (when there are fewer competitors, these challenges become individual.) In the final stage the colors of the two jackets disappear, to make room for the coveted black jackets. Whoever wins these challenges (which can also occur externally) is rewarded with a particularly entertaining or relaxing excursion. The losers, however, remain at Hell's Kitchen, or in a place outside, to serve a punishment consisting of very tiring, and, in some cases, humiliating, labor. The result of these tests, however, has no influence on what will be the final judgment of the episode.

In the second part of the episode, the contestants have to cook the dishes for restaurant customers (about 60), half of which are served by the blue team and the other half by the red, and Renato check their quality. Based on the work done, Renato decides which of the two teams was the worst, or both teams might be losers. Among either or both teams, Renato will choose a chef who stood out positively over the others; they will be requested to nominate two teammates, including themselves. Renato will choose who will be eliminated from the game. However, it is also possible that Renato decides not to take these into account at time of nomination; he may eliminate competitors who have not been appointed, even those who belonged to the winning team, by virtue of their poor performance or inappropriate behavior. Similarly, competitors may be directly disposed of during the evening service, while in other cases no one is eliminated.

Chef Renato Mekolli runs the kitchen with the help of two sous-chefs: Bleri Dervshi and Eri Muhaj in the first season, Albana Dulellari and Ani Alku in the second season, Francesko Tuku and Visara Pirra in the third season.

Cast

Seasons

References

External links

Hell's Kitchen (TV series)
2018 Albanian television series debuts
2021 Albanian television series endings
2010s Albanian television series
2020s Albanian television series
Albanian reality television series
Non-British television series based on British television series
Top Channel original programming